The 1980–81 Houston Cougars men's basketball team represented the University of Houston in NCAA Division I competition in the 1980–81 season.

Houston, coached by Guy Lewis, played its home games in the Hofheinz Pavilion in Houston, Texas, and was then a member of the Southwest Conference.

Roster

Schedule and results

|-
!colspan=9 style=| Regular season

|-
!colspan=9 style=| SWC Tournament

|-
!colspan=9 style=| NCAA Tournament

Rankings

References

Houston Cougars men's basketball seasons
Houston
Houston
Houston
Houston